Parliamentary elections were held in Gazankulu on 7 September 1983.

References

1983 elections in South Africa
Elections in South African bantustans
Gazankulu